The Fiat 501 is a car produced by Fiat between 1919 and 1926. The 501 was Fiat's first model after World War I. Fiat introduced the S and SS sports versions of the 501 in 1921. Fiat produced 47,600 501s in total.

Engines

References
Fiat Personenwagen, Fred Steiningen, 1994. 

501
Cars introduced in 1919
1920s cars